CaMia Beryon Jackson (née Hopson; born June 19, 1969) is an American politician serving as a member of the Georgia House of Representatives from the 153rd district.

Background 
Prior to entering politics, she worked as a senior computer systems analyst. Hopson earned a Bachelor of Science degree in computer information systems from Albany State University in 1994. She and her husband, Derrick Jackson, have seven children.

References 

Living people
People from Albany, Georgia
Democratic Party members of the Georgia House of Representatives
Albany State University alumni
Women state legislators in Georgia (U.S. state)
African-American state legislators in Georgia (U.S. state)
21st-century American politicians
21st-century American women politicians
21st-century African-American women
21st-century African-American politicians
1969 births